Roaring Brook is a tributary of Cruser Brook in Somerset County, New Jersey, in the United States.

Course

See also
List of rivers of New Jersey

References

External links
USGS Coordinates in Google Maps

Tributaries of the Raritan River
Rivers of New Jersey
Rivers of Somerset County, New Jersey